Euphrasia may refer to:

Euphrasia, a genus of flowering plants
Saint Euphrasia of Constantinople
Saint Euphrasia Eluvathingal
"Euphrasia: A Tale of Greece", 1838 short story by Mary Shelley